J-One is a French television channel dedicated to Asian anime and culture. It was launched on 4 October 2013.

J-One broadcast anime in simulcast. Many of these are then broadcast with French dub on Game One.

J-One was a Canal+ exclusive, until 2019 when it joined ISP bouquets.

References

External links

Paramount International Networks
Television stations in France
Television channels and stations established in 2013
2013 establishments in France
Anime television